Égreville is a commune in the Seine-et-Marne department in the Île-de-France region in north-central France.

Demographics
Inhabitants of Égreville are called Égrevillois.

See also
Communes of the Seine-et-Marne department

References

External links

Communes of Seine-et-Marne